Rossetter Park is a public park located on the East side of Highland Avenue between Oak Street and Shady Lane in Eau Gallie, Florida.  The park contains the Houston Pioneer Cemetery.  The park also contains several grand old live oaks festooned with hanging moss.

Gallery

Eau Gallie, Florida
Parks in Brevard County, Florida